Sedgemoor is a local government district in the English county of Somerset. In the United Kingdom, the term listed building refers to a building or other structure officially designated as being of special architectural, historical or cultural significance; Grade I structures are those considered to be "buildings of exceptional interest". Listing was begun by a provision in the Town and Country Planning Act 1947. Once listed, severe restrictions are imposed on the modifications allowed to a building's structure or its fittings. In England, the authority for listing under the Planning (Listed Buildings and Conservation Areas) Act 1990 rests with Historic England, a non-departmental public body sponsored by the Department for Digital, Culture, Media and Sport; local authorities have a responsibility to regulate and enforce the planning regulations.

Sedgemoor is a low-lying area of land close to sea level between the Quantock and Mendip hills, historically largely marsh (or moor). It contains the bulk of the area also known as the Somerset Levels, including Europe's oldest known engineered roadway, the Sweet Track.

There are 53 Grade I listed buildings in Sedgemoor, 14 of which are in Castle Street, Bridgwater. In 1723–1728, Castle Street was built on the site of the demolished Bridgwater Castle, as homes for the merchants trading in the town's port. Outside the town of Bridgwater, the largest concentration of Grade I listed buildings are in the village of Cannington, where the 12th-century Cannington Court and 14th-century Church of St Mary were both associated with a Benedictine nunnery. Cannington is also the site of the 13th-century Gurney Manor and Blackmoor Farmhouse, which was built around 1480 with its own chapel. Most of the Grade I listed buildings in Sedgemoor are Norman- or medieval-era churches, many of which are included in the Somerset towers, a collection of distinctive, mostly spireless Gothic church towers. Many of the more recent structures in the list are manor houses such as Halswell House, where the south range was built in the 16th century for Sir Nicholas Halswell and the  main north range in 1689 for Sir Halswell Tynte. The most recently constructed building in the list is the Corn Exchange in Bridgwater, built in 1834.

Buildings

|}

See also
 List of Grade I listed buildings in Somerset
 :Category:Grade I listed buildings in Somerset
 Grade II* listed buildings in Sedgemoor

Notes

References

 
Lists of Grade I listed buildings in Somerset